Time in Nauru is given by Nauru Time (NRT; UTC+12:00), also known infrequently as "Nauru Alternate Time". Nauru does not have an associated daylight saving time.

UTC+12:00 is not officially the legal time, however, due to the peculiar way the legislative Nauru Standard Time Act 1978 is worded, which proposed adopting either "Nauru Standard Time" as UTC+11:00, or "Nauru Alternate Time" as UTC+12:00. The latter time is commonly used however.

IANA time zone database 
In the IANA time zone database, Nauru is given the time zone Pacific/Nauru.

References

External links 
Nauru Time (NRT)
Current time in Nauru at Time.is

Time in Nauru